Gay Archeological Site is a historic archaeological site located at Osage City, Cole County, Missouri.  The Gay Archaeological Site contains examples of Late Woodland period mound and fortification groupings.

It was listed on the National Register of Historic Places in 1971.

References

Archaeological sites on the National Register of Historic Places in Missouri
Buildings and structures in Cole County, Missouri
National Register of Historic Places in Cole County, Missouri